The Ministry of the Electronics Industry (Minelektronprom) was a government ministry in the Soviet Union.

Established in 1961 as State Committee for Electronics Technology, it became a ministry in 1965. Its primary responsibility is for research, development, and production of electronic and electrical devices, including solid-state and miniature electronic components and devices. The Ministry of the Electronics Industry was the monopolistic producer of electronic components for military and civilian applications in the Soviet Union. It produced a wide variety of electronic appliances, most of them under the Electronika brand.

List of ministers
Source:
 Aleksandr Shokin (2.10.1965 - 18.11.1985)
 Vladislav Kolesnikov (18.11.1985 - 24.8.1991)

References